Jackson Edward Betts (May 26, 1904 – August 13, 1993) was a Republican member of the U.S. House of Representatives from Ohio from 1951 to 1973. He also served as Speaker of the House in the Ohio Legislature.

Early life and career 
Jackson Edward Betts was born in Findlay, Ohio, to John and Elizabeth (Fisher) Betts.  He graduated from Kenyon College in Gambier, Ohio, in 1926, and from Yale Law School in New Haven, Connecticut, in 1929.  He was admitted to the bar in 1930, and commenced the practice of law in Findlay, Ohio.  He served as prosecuting attorney of Hancock County, Ohio, from 1933 to 1937.

Legislative career 
He was a member of the Ohio House of Representatives from 1937 to 1947, serving as speaker in 1945 and 1946.

Congress 
Betts was elected as a Republican to the Eighty-second and to the ten succeeding Congresses.  He was not a candidate in 1972 for reelection to the Ninety-third Congress.  He was a part-time teacher at Findlay College from 1973 to 1983 and acting judge of Findlay Municipal Court from 1981 to 1989.  He was a resident of Findlay, Ohio, until his death there on August 13, 1993. Betts voted in favor of the Civil Rights Acts of 1957, 1960, 1964, and 1968, and the Voting Rights Act of 1965.

Death
He died in 1993 in Findlay, Ohio at the age of 89.

Sources

The Political Graveyard

1904 births
1993 deaths
Republican Party members of the United States House of Representatives from Ohio
Speakers of the Ohio House of Representatives
Ohio lawyers
Ohio state court judges
People from Findlay, Ohio
Kenyon College alumni
Yale Law School alumni
County district attorneys in Ohio
Republican Party members of the Ohio House of Representatives
20th-century American lawyers
20th-century American politicians
20th-century American judges